Zamane (زمان) is a monthly magazine based in Casablanca, Morocco dedicated to the history of Morocco, published in two different versions: Arabic and French.

History 
The French version launched November 2010; the Arabic version, October 2013. Both were founded by the Moroccan journalist Youssef Chmirou. Zamane is the first and only history magazine in Morocco.

In October 2013, Zamane was published in Arabic with content different from that of the French version.

Content
Contributors to the magazine, which usually runs over 100 pages, include researchers and professors from Morocco, and sometimes from abroad. The magazine has many images, both photographs and drawings, many of which come from private collections or the personal archives of historians. Zamane states its goal as the preservation of contemporary Moroccan history, from pre-history to the present, and the promotion of the country's history to those who are irritated with official and curricular historiography.

References

External links

Arabic-language magazines
French-language mass media in Morocco
History magazines
History of Morocco
Magazines established in 2010
Multilingual magazines
Mass media in Casablanca
Magazines published in Morocco
Monthly magazines